Weightlifting competitions at the 2012 Summer Olympics in London were held from 28 July to 7 August in the ExCeL venue. Fifteen gold medals were awarded and 260 athletes took part (156 men and 104 women).

Events
15 sets of medals were awarded in the following events:

Qualification

Medal summary
The results of the 2012 Olympic weightlifting competition have been significantly revised after doping was uncovered through retests of samples from these Games.

Medal table

Men's events

Women's events

Notes
  Valentin Hristov of Azerbaijan originally won the bronze medal, but was disqualified in 2019 after testing positive for steroids.
 Răzvan Martin of Romania originally won the bronze medal, but was disqualified in 2020 after a retest of his 2012 sample tested positive for steroids.
   Apti Aukhadov of Russia originally won the silver medal, but was disqualified in 2016 after a retest of his 2012 sample tested positive for steroids.
  Ilya Ilyin of Kazakhstan, Aleksandr Ivanov of Russia, and Anatolie Cîrîcu of Moldova originally won the gold, silver and bronze medals, respectively, but were all disqualified in 2016 after retests of their 2012 samples were positive for steroids. Fourth-placed Andrey Demanov of Russia, sixth-placed Intigam Zairov of Azerbaijan, and seventh-placed Almas Uteshov of Kazakhstan were also disqualified for the same reason.
   Oleksiy Torokhtiy of Ukraine originally won the gold medal, and Ruslan Nurudinov of Uzbekistan originally finished fourth, but were both disqualified as  retests of their 2012 samples were positive for performance-enhancing drugs.
  Zulfiya Chinshanlo of Kazakhstan and Cristina Iovu of Moldova originally won the gold and bronze medals respectively, but were both disqualified in 2016 after testing positive for steroids.
  Yuliya Kalina of Ukraine originally won the bronze medal, but was disqualified in 2016 after a retest of her 2012 sample tested positive for steroids.
  Maiya Maneza of Kazakhstan originally won the gold medal, but was disqualified in 2016 after a retest of her 2012 sample tested positive for stanozolol. Fourth-placed Sibel Şimşek of Turkey was also disqualified for the same reason. On 5 April 2017, original silver medalist Svetlana Tsarukaeva of Russia was also disqualified for the same reason.
 Maryna Shkermankova of Belarus originally won the bronze medal, but was disqualified in 2016 after a retest of her 2012 sample was positive for steroids. Fourth-placed Dzina Sazanavets of Belarus was also disqualified for the same reason. Roxana Cocoș of Romania originally won the silver medal, but was disqualified in 2020 after a failed retest of her sample from 2012 tested positive for steroids.
  Svetlana Podobedova of Kazakhstan, Natalya Zabolotnaya of Russia, and Iryna Kulesha of Belarus originally won the gold, silver, and bronze medals respectively, but were all disqualified in 2016 after retests of their 2012 samples were positive for steroids.
  Hripsime Khurshudyan of Armenia originally won the bronze medal, but was disqualified in 2016 after a retest of her 2012 sample was positive for steroids.

Olympic and world records broken

Women

Men

References

External links 

 
 
 
 

 
2012 Summer Olympics events
Olympics
2012
International weightlifting competitions hosted by the United Kingdom